The borders of Greece from the Protocol of London from March 22, 1829 until the accession of the Dodecanese were changed nine times and its territorial extensions were seven.

First borders of independent Greece
The Poros Conference in 1828, immediately after the Battle of Navarino, had the primary task of delineating the future borders of the Greek state. John Capodistria presents two plans for the land border:
 Arta–Volos line and 3.5 km north of the Gulf of Arta
 The Haliacmon–Metsovo–Ionian Sea line (Haliacmon–Aoös line)

According to the London Protocol (1829), the land border to the north is established on the Arta–Volos line. The British strongly opposed the border in western Greece due to their interest in keeping the mainland opposite the British protectorate of the Ionian Islands away from Greek hands, lest it encourage irredentionist aspirations in the islands. The subsequent London Protocol (1830), however, returned the land border to the Aspropotamos–Spercheios line.

The Treaty of Constantinople (1832), confirmed at the London Conference of 1832 establishing the new land border of the Kingdom of Greece finally on the Arta–Volos line.

Subsequent changes
 2 May 1864 (Treaty of London): Union of the Ionian Islands with Greece
 2 July 1881 (Convention of Constantinople): Annexation of Thessaly (except Elassona) and the Arta Prefecture
 4 December 1897 (Treaty of Constantinople): Following the Greco-Turkish War of 1897, minor territorial adjustments to the Greco-Ottoman border line were undertaken in favour of the Ottomans. Crete becomes an autonomous state with a Greek prince as high commissioner.
 30 May 1913 (Treaty of London): Following the First Balkan War, Greece secures much of Macedonia and Epirus, as well as Crete; the status of Northern Epirus and the islands of the eastern Aegean Sea, occupied by the Greek army, remain undetermined. The Greek gains are recognized by the Ottoman Empire in the Treaty of Athens on 14 November 1913.
 1 June 1913 (Greek–Serbian Treaty of Peace, Friendship and Mutual Protection): delineation of the Greek–Serbian border (now the border between Greece and North Macedonia).
 10 August 1913 (Treaty of Bucharest): Following the Second Balkan War, Greece secures eastern Macedonia from Bulgaria, up to Kavala.
 17 December 1913: The Great Powers assign Northern Epirus to Albania, and order Greek troops to leave. 
 13 February 1914 The Great Powers assign the islands of the eastern Aegean (apart from the Italian-occupied Dodecanese) to Greece. Imbros, Tenedos, and Kastellorizo are returned to the Ottoman Empire.
 27 November 1919 (Treaty of Neuilly): Western Thrace, formerly Bulgarian, is annexed to Greece.
 10 August 1920 (Treaty of Sèvres): Eastern Thrace up to the Chataldja is annexed to Greece; the Smyrna Zone is placed under Greek control for five years, after which a plebiscite will determine its future fate.
 24 July 1923 (Treaty of Lausanne): Following the Greco-Turkish War of 1919–1922, the Treaty of Sèvres is annulled. Eastern Thrace and Smyrna return to Turkish control, as well as the Karagach Triangle in lieu of reparations. A Greco-Turkish population exchange is agreed.
 10 February 1947 (Treaty of Paris): The Dodecanese are transferred to Greece.

References

Greece
Borders of Greece
History of modern Greece